A Center buffer couping may refer to: 
 A Centre Buffer Coupler
 A centre buffer coupling 
 A balance lever coupling
 Center-buffer couplers
 A center-buffer coupler 
 An ABC coupler